Luddendenfoot railway station served the village of Luddendenfoot in West Yorkshire, England, from 1840 until 1962.

History

Under him was a porter named Watson; and when Brontë went drinking, he left Watson in charge. Later, an audit of the station accounts showed a deficit of eleven pounds, one shilling and sevenpence, which Watson had probably stolen; but Brontë was dismissed, and also had to make up the shortfall from his outstanding salary.

In 1880 the bridge across the River Calder leading to the station was destroyed by a flood. The Luddendenfoot Local Board of Health commissioned the new Boy Bridge from Halifax architects Utley and Grey, with James Wild, a local stonemason and ironwork by Wood Brothers of Sowerby Bridge. James Wild also built the Station Bridge over the Rochdale Canal. The Lancashire and Yorkshire Railway contributed £1,625 to the cost of rebuilding the bridge and it was completed in 1882.

Two fatal accidents occurred close to the station before its closure - the first in 1925 and the second thirty years later in 1955.

The station closed on 10 September 1962.

The site has been developed since 2007 and the northern half is now occupied by the Station Industrial Park, which is accessible via Old Station Road. Two gate pillars from the original station flank the entrance to the road.

References

External links
 Luddendenfoot station on navigable 1947 O. S. map

Disused railway stations in Calderdale
Former Lancashire and Yorkshire Railway stations
Railway stations in Great Britain opened in 1840
Railway stations in Great Britain closed in 1962